The men's single sculls competition at the 1988 Summer Olympics took place at Misari Regatta, South Korea. The event was held from 19 to 24 September. It was the 20th appearance of the event, which had been held at every Olympic Games since the introduction of rowing in 1900. NOCs were limited to one boat apiece; 22 sent a competitor in the men's single sculls. Thomas Lange of East Germany won the event, denying Pertti Karppinen a record fourth-straight win and starting a two-Games winning streak (and three-Games medal streak) of his own. Peter-Michael Kolbe of West Germany took his third silver (after 1976 and 1984), joining Karppinen and Vyacheslav Ivanov as three-time medalists in the event (three other men, including Lange, have joined that group since, as of the 2016 Games). New Zealand earned its first medal in the event since 1920, with Eric Verdonk taking bronze.

Background

Due to boycotts in 1980 and 1984, this was the first time since 1976 that all of the strongest rowing nations were present. The single sculls field included Finland's Pertti Karppinen (three-time defending gold medalist in 1976, 1980, and 1984), East Germany's Thomas Lange (then-current world champion, in his first Olympic appearance), and West Germany's Peter-Michael Kolbe (silver medalist behind Karppinen in 1976 and 1984, and five-time world champion). Andrew Sudduth of the United States had won a silver medal in 1984 in the eight; Dirk Crois of Belgium similarly changed events from 1984, when he took silver in double sculls. Other Olympic veterans were France's Pascal Body (5th in quadruple sculls in 1984), Brazil's Denis Marinho (7th in coxed four in 1984), and Puerto Rico's Juan Felix (10th in this event in 1984).

Kuwait, the Philippines, and South Korea each made their debut in the event. The United States made its 16th appearance, most among nations.

Competition format

This rowing event was a single scull event, meaning that each boat was propelled by a single rower. The "scull" portion means that the rower used two oars, one on each side of the boat. The course used the 2000 metres distance that became the Olympic standard in 1912. 

The competition consisted of three main rounds (quarterfinals, semifinals, and finals) as well as a repechage. The 22 boats were divided into four heats for the quarterfinals, with 5 or 6 boats in each heat. The winning boat in each heat (4 boats total) advanced directly to the semifinals. The remaining 18 boats were placed in the repechage. The repechage featured four heats of 4 or 5 boats each, with the top two boats in each heat (8 boats total) advancing to the semifinals and the remaining 10 boats (4th and 5th placers in the repechage) being eliminated. The 12 semifinalist boats were divided into two heats of 6 boats each. The top three boats in each semifinal (6 boats total) advanced to the "A" final to compete for medals and 4th through 6th place; the bottom three boats in each semifinal were sent to the "B" final for 7th through 12th.

Schedule

All times are Korea Standard Time adjusted for daylight savings (UTC+10)

Results

Quarterfinals

The winner in each heat advanced directly to the semifinals. The remaining rowers competed in the repechage round for the remaining spots in the semifinals.

Quarterfinal 1

Quarterfinal 2

Quarterfinal 3

Quarterfinal 4

Repechage

The two fastest rowers in each repechage heat advanced to the semifinals.

Repechage heat 1

Repechage heat 2

Repechage heat 3

Repechage heat 4

Semifinals

The three fastest rowers in each semifinal advanced to the "A" final, while the others went to the "B" final.

Semifinal 1

Semifinal 2

Finals

Final B

Final A

Results summary

References

Sources

Rowing at the 1988 Summer Olympics
Men's events at the 1988 Summer Olympics